The following lists events that happened in 1979 in El Salvador.

Incumbents
President: Carlos Humberto Romero (until 15 October), Revolutionary Government Junta (starting 15 October)
Vice President: Julio Ernesto Astacio (until 15 October), Vacant (starting 15 October)

Events

October
 15 October – The Armed Forces of El Salvador deposed President Humberto Romero in a military coup d'état and established the Revolutionary Government Junta. The Salvadoran Civil War began.

Deaths

 20 January – Octavio Ortiz, Catholic priest (b. 1944)
 20 June – Rafael Palacios, Catholic priest (b. ?)
 4 August – Napoleón Macías, Catholic priest (b. ?)

References

 
El Salvador
1970s in El Salvador
Years of the 20th century in El Salvador
El Salvador